The Diwei Bridge is a cable-stayed bridge which crosses the Yangtze River in Chongqing, China. The bridge carries road of traffic between the Jiangjin District south of the Yangtze River and the Dadukou District to the north.

See also
 Yangtze River bridges and tunnels

Bridges in Chongqing
Bridges over the Yangtze River
Cable-stayed bridges in China
Bridges completed in 2004